The 34th César Awards ceremony was presented by the Académie des Arts et Techniques du Cinéma to honour its selection of the best films of 2008 on 27 February 2009. Canal+ broadcast the event, which took place again at Théâtre du Châtelet in Paris, France. The nominations for the Awards were announced on 23 January.  The ceremony was chaired by Charlotte Gainsbourg and hosted by Antoine de Caunes. Séraphine won the award for Best Film.

Winners and nominees

Viewers
The show was followed by 2.1 millions of viewers. This corresponds to 11.4% of the audience.

See also
 81st Academy Awards
 62nd British Academy Film Awards
 21st European Film Awards
 14th Lumières Awards

References

External links

 Official website
 
 34th César Awards at AlloCiné

2009
2009 film awards
2009 in French cinema